Fort Saint-Elme is a military fort built between 1538 and 1552 by Charles V. It is located in the district of Collioure, 30 km southeast of Perpignan, in the department of Pyrénées-Orientales. It is designated as a monument historique of the Côte Vermeille. Since 2008, the fort has been a museum with medieval and Renaissance arms collections, exhibitions and a panorama over the area from the terrace.

Localisation 

Fort Saint-Elme is located at the top of a hill overhanging Collioure on the west and Port-Vendres on the east. One can reach the fort following a local road linking the D114 road at the north through the Coll d'en Raixat at the south.

Toponymy 

Several assumptions exist for the origins of Saint Elme: Firstly, the name of Saint-Elme may come from Erasmus of Formia, an Italian martyr of the 4th century. Secondly, it could have been given in honor of the Spanish saint Peter González (1190-1246). This explains why we find this name around the western Mediterranean coasts: Saint Elme in Naples, Sant Elme in St Feliu de Guixols, Sant Helme and Santem in Provence, etc. Saint Erasmus may have become the patron saint of sailors because he is said to have continued preaching even after a thunderbolt struck the ground beside him. This prompted sailors, who were in danger from sudden storms and lightning, to claim his prayers. The electrical discharges at the mastheads of ships were read as a sign of his protection and came to be called "Saint Elmo's Fire."

By decree on 3 June 1794, during the French Revolution, the city briefly took the name of Fort-du-Rocher (Rock's fort).

History

From the origins to the Middle Ages 
The history of Fort Saint-Elme began with the edification of the watchtower in the 8th century, i.e., either during the period when Arab-Berber troops occupied Septimania between 719 and 759. Integrated into the Marca Hispanica, the tower belonged to the independent Counts of Roussillon until the death without heirs of Girard II of Roussillon in 1172. He bequeathed his county to Alfonso II, King of Aragon and Count of Barcelona. During the Aragonese period, the tower took its nickname "Torre de la guardia" (Watchtower).

Between 1276 and 1344, Majorca’s kings, whose summer residence was the castle of Collioure, rebuilt this signal tower from this ideal point of view. This tower was integrated into an efficient communication system, including the Massane and Madeloc towers located on the heights of Collioure and funded by James II of Aragon in the 13th century. These towers communicated through smoke signals that permitted alerting the surrounding population with smoke signals (black or white, discontinuous or continuous) according to the danger. At night, some dry wood entitled to light fires to alert garrisons until Perpignan. By day, some green wood was used to emit smoke and thus communicate with the others towers and strongholds of the region. But it was the enemy of the kingdom of Majorca, the king Peter IV of Aragon, who, once he conquered the coast in 1344, did significant military work to improve the defense of the fort.

During the second part of the 15th century, the French controlled the Roussillon. In 1462, king Louis XI took advantage of the Catalan civil war (1462-1472) to sign the treaty of Bayonne and thus took over the counties of Roussillon and Cerdagne. The French decided to strengthen the fort, which took the name of Saint Elme. A part of the ramparts dates from this period. The successor of Louis XI, Charles VIII, who wanted to assure the neutrality of Spain for his ambitions over the kingdom of Naples, signed with Ferdinand II of Aragon the treaty of Barcelona in 1493. The Catholic king recovered thus the lost territories.

The fortification of Charles V 

In the 16th century, the Roussillon was essential to the Spanish kingdom. The region had a triangular shape delimitated by the cordilleras in the north, the Albera Massif in the south, and the Mediterranean Sea in the east. Perpignan was an important industrial, cultural and commercial center that got important privileged links with the wealth of Italy. Perpignan was defended in the north by the Fortress of Salses and in the south by the Fort Saint-Elme. This castle also protected the Collioure and Port-Vendres ports which assured supplies and troops helpers to the regional capital of Roussillon.

The progress of modern artillery profoundly changed war art and siege technics. Architects and artillerymen were converted to new war masters and advisers of sovereigns. In 1537, the Italian architect Benedetto of Ravenna caught the emperor’s attention on the weaknesses of the Collioure position. After an inspection, Benedetto obtained the agreement of Charles V. He began the works in 1538 until 1552 and transformed the fort’s appearance, which took its star-shaped aspect.

A French fort 

Despite this modernization and its adaptation to the artillery, on 13 April 1642, French troops of king Louis XIII achieved to take the fort. After the signing of the Treaty of the Pyrenees in 1659, the Spanish threat remained. When Vauban, a military architect of King Louis XIV, made a reconnaissance of the defensive structures in 1659 in the region of Collioure, he decided to build a counterscarp, which formed with the base of the ramparts a ten-meter pit where infantry and cannons could easily operate.

Around 1780, the fort’s facade was whitened to serve as a landmark from the sea, with the Massane Tower, to better situate the port of Port-Vendres.

During the French Revolution, more precisely during the War of the Pyrenees, between 1793 and 1795, the region was the center of violent fights. Fort Saint Elme was conquered successively by the Royalists and Republicans. In 1794, the Spanish army took the fort. Six months later, general Dugommier crushed with 11 000 cannonballs the garrison, which surrendered on 25 May 1794 after a 22-day siege. After the revolutionary period, the fort, unified with the Collioure's municipality, was transformed into a military warehouse.

A private museum 

Fort Saint-Elme was demilitarized in 1903 and abandoned. The tower was shattered, the (shooting place) was partly impracticable, and many walls threatened to collapse. On 21 August 1913, the State decided to auction the fort. Several owners succeeded, but no restoration was made. The fort was registered as Monument Historique by decree of 2 April 1927. A new owner decided thus to restore it. The works ended in 1936. During WWII, the fort was occupied by the Kriegsmarine between 1942 and 1944. At their escape, some buildings were dynamited to block the progress of allied troops. The fort was partially rebuilt in 1950, but most restoration began in 2004. Since 2008, the fort has been a museum.

Architecture 

The interior of the fort Saint-Elme is composed of rooms edified around the exterior circumference of the tower. On the first floor were the troop's dormitories, the weapons room, the throne room, the jail, and the oven. Today, the floor is fitted with historical objects which date from the 15th to 19th century: helmets, knights’ armors, chests, polished-stone and iron cannonballs, medieval and "Renaissance" weapons (culverin, falconet, crossbows, halberds, flails, hammers, lances, bows, swords, arquebus, 16th-century pistols), howitzer fragments.

Other rooms reveal the history of the monument: the genealogy and life of Charles V, the fortifications of Vauban, the inventory of 1770 and the attack of general Dugommier in 1794.

On the second floor, the flour and artillery warehouses were next to the guardroom and the bakery. Saint-Elme, a stronghold with an ingenious defensive system, has been conceived to support sieges and resist to assaults. Some walls reach up to eight meters thick. The tower contained the powder. The shooting place could receive more than 20 cannons and howitzers. 

The undergrounds are not open to the public. Formerly, they were used as a warehouse for food and housing. They could also house all trades (corps de metier) necessary to the fight.

References

Saint-Elme
Renaissance architecture in France